Fox Sports FC  (formerly Total Football) was an Australian football (soccer) discussion show that televised on Fox Sports.

History
Aired at 8:30pm every Tuesday night on Fox Sports, the show was split into two halves, with the first half of the show dedicated to the A-League and the second to European football.

Regular panelists included Andy Harper, Mark Bosnich, Melanie McLaughlin, Mark Rudan and others to discuss and dissect the weekend's action. The European-based segment primarily discusses the Premier League, with wrap-ups and highlights of football around the world. The European section usually included a guest from England via video link such as Darren Lewis, Ray Parlour, Gary O'Reilly and Stewart Robson.

See also

The World Game

References

External links

Fox Sports (Australian TV network) original programming
Australian sports television series
2000s Australian television series
2010s Australian television series
English-language television shows
A-League Men on television